Mark David Duplass (born December 7, 1976) is an American filmmaker, actor, writer, and musician. With his brother Jay Duplass, he started the film production company Duplass Brothers Productions in 1996, in which they wrote and directed The Puffy Chair (2005), Baghead (2008), Cyrus (2010), Jeff, Who Lives at Home (2011), and The Do-Deca-Pentathlon (2012). 

Duplass co-wrote and co-produced the television anthology series Room 104 (2017–2020), and co-wrote and starred in the horror film Creep (2014) and its 2017 sequel. His other acting credits include Humpday (2009), The League (2009–2015), Greenberg (2010), The Mindy Project (2012–2014), Safety Not Guaranteed (2012), Tammy (2014), The One I Love (2014), The Lazarus Effect (2015), Togetherness (2015–2016), Blue Jay (2016), Tully (2018), Goliath (2018–2019), Paddleton (2019), Bombshell (2019), and Language Lessons (2021).

For his potryal of Charlie "Chip" Black in The Morning Show (2019–present), Duplass received a nomination for the Primetime Emmy Award for Outstanding Supporting Actor in a Drama Series. He was also the lead singer of the indie rock band Volcano, I'm Still Excited!!

Early life
Duplass was born on December 7, 1976 in New Orleans, Louisiana, to Cynthia (née Ernst) and Lawrence Duplass. He was raised as a Roman Catholic, and attended Jesuit High School, University of Texas at Austin, and City University of New York-City College. His ancestry includes French Cajun, Italian, Ashkenazi Jewish, and German.

Career
Duplass has written, directed, and produced several  feature films with his brother Jay Duplass. In 2005, he wrote and produced The Puffy Chair with his brother, in addition to portraying one of the main characters.

The two brothers later wrote, directed, and produced the films Baghead (2008) and Cyrus (2010) together and have a unique style which consists of a great deal of ad-libbing off of the original script, shooting a number of takes, and editing scenes down 15 to 20 times.  Their films Jeff, Who Lives at Home and The Do-Deca-Pentathlon were released in 2012. In 2014, Mark co-wrote, produced and starred in the horror film Creep alongside Patrick Brice, appearing in the film as Josef. In May 2016, it was announced that there would be a sequel to Creep. Creep 2 was released in October 2017 which Duplass again co-wrote and starred in.

In 2009, Duplass starred in the FX comedy television series The League, with his wife, Katie Aselton. In 2015, the HBO series Togetherness debuted, which was created by and stars Duplass. That same year, Duplass co-starred with Evan Peters and Olivia Wilde in David Gelb's thriller film The Lazarus Effect. In 2015, both Mark and Jay Duplass via their Duplass Brothers Television banner signed a two-year overall deal with HBO.

In 2018, Duplass was in a Wealthsimple commercial, he appeared in Tully and Duck Butter, and released his debut book Like Brothers alongside Jay Duplass. He also starred as real estate developer Tom Wyatt in Season 2 of the Amazon Video series Goliath.

In 2019, Duplass starred in the Netflix comedy film, Paddleton, in which he was also a co-writer and executive producer.

Other ventures 
Duplass was the lead singer of the indie rock band Volcano, I'm Still Excited!! He also co-wrote the autobiographical book Like Brothers in 2018 with Jay Duplass.

Personal life 
Duplass is married to his The League and The Puffy Chair co-star, Katie Aselton. They have two daughters, Ora (born 2007) and Molly (born 2012).

Filmography

Film

Executive producer only
 Bass Ackwards (2010)
 The Freebie (2010)
 Lovers of Hate (2012)
 Your Sister's Sister (2012)
 Safety Not Guaranteed (2012)
 Bad Milo (2013)
 The One I Love (2014)
 The Skeleton Twins (2014)
Adult Beginners (2014)
 The Lazarus Effect (2015)
 The Bronze (2015)
 Tangerine (2015)
 6 Years (2015)
 Manson Family Vacation (2015)
 Asperger's Are Us (2016) (Documentary)
 Take Me (2017)
 Outside In (2017)
 Duck Butter (2018)
 The MisEducation of Bindu (2019)
 Horse Girl (2020)
 Young Hearts (2020)
 As of Yet (2021)
 Not Going Quietly (2021) (Documentary)
 Drought (2021)
 7 Days (2021)

Television

Short films

Acting roles

Film

Television

Bibliography 

 Like Brothers (2018) (with Jay Duplass)

Awards and nominations

References

External links
 
 
 Interview with Jay and Mark Duplass on "Baghead" at IFC.com

1976 births
21st-century American male actors
American film directors
American male film actors
American male television actors
American male voice actors
Cajun people
City University of New York alumni
Living people
Male actors from New Orleans
University of Texas at Austin alumni
Writers from New Orleans
Primetime Emmy Award winners